Orlando Huff (born August 14, 1978) is a former American Football linebacker. He was drafted by the Seattle Seahawks in the fourth round of the 2001 NFL Draft. He played college football at Fresno State.

Huff was also a member of the Seattle Seahawks, Arizona Cardinals, Atlanta Falcons, and New York Sentinels.

Early years
Huff attended Upland High School, where he was on the football, basketball, and track and field teams.

College career
Huff played college football at Eastern Arizona College and Fresno State University.

Professional career

Seattle Seahawks
Huff was drafted in the fourth round (104th overall) of the 2001 NFL Draft.

Arizona Cardinals
In the 2005 season, Huff started in 15 games, making 69 tackles, one quarterback sack, and one interception for two yards.

References

External links
California Redwoods bio

1978 births
Living people
Sportspeople from Mobile, Alabama
American football outside linebackers
African-American players of American football
Fresno State Bulldogs football players
Seattle Seahawks players
Arizona Cardinals players
Atlanta Falcons players
Sacramento Mountain Lions players
Players of American football from Alabama
21st-century African-American sportspeople
20th-century African-American sportspeople